Captain John McClintock (1874–?) was the deputy Police Commissioner of New York City.

Biography
John was born in 1874 to Emory McClintock of the Mutual Life Insurance Company. He attended Berkeley School and later Columbia University and the New York University School of Law.

His United States Army service began in the Spanish–American War.

Frank Swett Black appointed him a major in the 203rd New York Volunteers. He was appointed by Douglas Imrie McKay as a First Deputy Police Commissioner of New York City on February 1, 1914.

He resigned on December 15, 1914 in the aftermath of the killing of Barnet Baff.

References

Deputy New York City Police Commissioners
1874 births
Year of death missing
Columbia University alumni
New York University School of Law alumni
American military personnel of the Spanish–American War